Marvin Nabwire Omondi (born 3 December 2000) is a Kenyan footballer who plays for A.F.C. Leopards as a midfielder.

Career
Born in Kakamega, Omondi has played club football for A.F.C. Leopards.

He made his international debut for Kenyan national team in 2018.

References

2000 births
Living people
Kenyan footballers
Kenya international footballers
A.F.C. Leopards players
Association football midfielders
Kenyan Premier League players